Mike Foley (born April 5, 1954) is an American politician who formerly served as the 41st lieutenant governor of Nebraska from 2015 to 2023. A member of the Republican Party, he was previously elected to the Nebraska Legislature from 2001 to 2007 and served as the Nebraska Auditor of Public Accounts from 2007 until 2015. Following the Nebraska 2022 elections he was elected and won to serve as auditor of Nebraska serving since 2023.

Personal life
Foley was born in Rochester, New York and graduated from Bishop Kearney High School in 1972, the State University of New York at Brockport in 1976, and Michigan State University with an M.B.A. He held summer positions in the offices of the United States Department of Transportation and the United States International Trade Commission.  For 18 years, he was the director of financial analysis for the National Association of Regulatory Utility Commissioners in Washington, DC.  Prior to that position he was a consultant with Kirschner Associates.

He is married to Nebraska native Susan (Seiker) Foley. They have six children and are members of St. Peter's Catholic Church in Lincoln, Nebraska.

Nebraska Legislature
Foley was elected in 2000 to represent the 29th Nebraska legislative district, and reelected in 2004 with 70% of the vote. He sat on the Judiciary and the Transportation and Telecommunications committees. He resigned in January, 2007 to become state auditor after winning a statewide election for that position in the 2006 election cycle.

In 2005, senator Foley opposed two bills prohibiting the state government's discriminating on the basis of sexual orientation; regarding the measures, he stated, "[H]omosexual conduct is wrong.  And it's OK to think that it is wrong. And it is OK to say that it is wrong."

Auditor of Public Accounts
On November 7, 2006, Foley defeated incumbent Democrat Kate Witek to become the Nebraska Auditor of Public Accounts. In 2010 he was re-elected to a second term with 80% of the statewide vote.

Lieutenant Governor of Nebraska
Pete Ricketts selected Foley to replace Lavon Heidemann as his running mate in the 2014 Nebraska governor's race. The ticket ran successfully again in 2018.

References

|-

|-

|-

|-

|-

 

 

1954 births
21st-century American politicians
Lieutenant Governors of Nebraska
Living people
Nebraska Auditors of Public Accounts
Republican Party Nebraska state senators
Politicians from Lincoln, Nebraska